St Denis Church is a Roman Catholic church in the Perth suburb of Joondanna, Western Australia. The building was designed by Ernest Rossen and Iris Rossen, and is inspired by the Chapel du Ronchamp. It was built in 1967 and consecrated in 1968.

The church has a pipe organ. The instrument was originally built in 1957 for the chapel at St John of God Subiaco Hospital. That chapel was demolished in 1994 and the organ was removed and rebuilt at St Denis. It was damaged during a severe storm in 2010, but subsequently repaired.

In 2010/11 a five-year plan to renovate the church building commenced:
 The crying room was converted to a gathering space.
 A new sound system was installed, including hearing units for those hard-of-hearing.
 Indoor toilets were installed.
 Reverse-cycle air-conditioning was installed.
 Solar panels were installed on the roof of the church and presbytery.

In 2014 the tabernacle was moved from its original location on the side of the sanctuary to directly behind the altar.

In 2017 a memorial garden was built on the west side, between the church and the presbytery.

History of the parish
The parish of St Denis was created by Archbishop Redmond Prendiville in 1952 by separating it from the larger parish of Osborne Park; responsibility for the new parish was given to the Servite Order, which had recently arrived in Australia. The first parish priest was Patrick Nolan. At the time, the new parish's church was a Nissen or Quonset hut on Wanneroo Road in Tuart Hill (now Joondanna) consecrated the previous year, which also acted as a school. In 1964, Nolan as replaced by Christopher Ross, who decided that a "proper" church was required.

The parish was named after the third-century Christian martyr, Saint Denis.

Notes

References

Roman Catholic churches in Perth, Western Australia
Roman Catholic churches completed in 1967
20th-century Roman Catholic church buildings in Australia